The Chigoubiche River is a tributary of the Ashuapmushuan River, flowing into the unorganized territory of Lac-Ashuapmushuan, Quebec and then into the Regional County Municipality (RCM) of Le Domaine-du-Roy, in the administrative region of Saguenay-Lac-Saint-Jean, in the province of Quebec, in Canada.

The Chigoubiche River flows in the townships of Argenson, Ailleboust and Chomedey. Forestry is the main economic activity of this valley; recreational tourism activities, second.

The route 167 which connects Chibougamau to Saint-Félicien, Quebec passes on the north-east side of Chigoubiche Lake and crosses the Chigoubiche River. The upper part of the river is served by the forest road R0212, R0203 and R0204.

The surface of the Chigoubiche River is usually frozen from early November to mid-May, however, safe ice circulation is generally from mid-November to mid-April.

Geography

Toponymy 
During the period between 1950 (about) and 1964, the Chigoubiche River was named "Argenson River". This toponymic designation was related to the name of the canton of Argenson where it originates in Lake Chigoubiche. The term "Argenson" evoked the memory of the fifth governor of New France (1658-1661).

The toponym "Chigoubiche River" was formalized on December 5, 1968, at the Commission de toponymie du Québec, when it was created.

Notes and references

See also 

Rivers of Saguenay–Lac-Saint-Jean
Le Domaine-du-Roy Regional County Municipality